Tired Theodore (German: Der müde Theodor) is a 1957 West German comedy film directed by Géza von Cziffra and starring Heinz Erhardt, Renate Ewert and Peter Weck. It was shot at the Göttingen Studios. The film's sets were designed by the art directors Dieter Bartels and Paul Markwitz.

Cast

References

Bibliography
 Bock, Hans-Michael & Bergfelder, Tim. The Concise CineGraph. Encyclopedia of German Cinema. Berghahn Books, 2009.

External links 

1957 films
West German films
1957 comedy films
German comedy films
1950s German-language films
German black-and-white films
German films based on plays
1950s German films
Films shot at Göttingen Studios